Houseparty was a social networking service that enabled group video chatting through mobile and desktop apps. Users received a notification when friends are online and available to group video chat. On average, users spent more than 60 minutes per conversation on the app in group or one-on-one chats. It was launched by Life on Air, Inc. in 2016 and was available on iOS, Android mobile devices, macOS and Google Chrome. Sima Sistani is the company's chief executive officer and co-founder. Epic Games announced the decision to discontinue Houseparty on September 9th, 2021 and removed it from the app stores on the same day. It continued to function for users who had already downloaded it until October 2021.

Development
In early 2015, Life On Air, Inc., a team headed by founder and CEO Ben Rubin, released the live streaming app Meerkat and raised $12 million in venture capital funding from Greylock Partners. Following the release, the creators began developing a new app called Houseparty that moved "away from public broadcasts in favor of private chats."

Houseparty was released to the App Store and Play Store in February 2016 under a pseudonym. It was developed over 10 months with a website redirecting to the Houseparty app in October 2016. The company raised $52 million in venture capital funding from Sequoia Capital in late 2016. It was available on macOS as of 2018.

Acquisition and expansion
Co-founder Sistani was announced as the company's chief executive officer in March 2019 and led the acquisition of Houseparty by Epic Games later that year. Life on Air, Inc. became a subsidiary of Epic Games and the monetary terms of the acquisition were not disclosed. Sistani noted that Houseparty was being used by Fortnite players, so "the partnership made a lot of sense."

In May 2020, Houseparty announced "In The House", a three-day festival with live at-home performances by celebrities such as Alicia Keys, Neil Patrick Harris, Zooey Deschanel and Terry Crews.

On September 9, 2021, Epic Games announced that they were planning to shut down the Houseparty service in October of the same year, having announced that the app was to be delisted immediately from mobile app stores. Both the main video chatting service and the app's "Fortnite Mode" which integrated the app's video chat into Fortnite Battle Royale which was introduced in November 2020, were to function as usual until the service's discontinuation.

Technology
Houseparty is a "face-to-face social network" where up to eight participants can interact in a single session. Users receive a notification when friends are online and available to group video chat or float between chat rooms.

During early 2019, the company partnered with Ellen DeGeneres's app, "Heads Up!", which is similar to charades. In the summer of 2020, Houseparty partnered with Mattel to add Magic 8-Ball and the card game, Uno to the app. The app contains other popular games such as Quick Draw, Chips & Guac and trivia games that can be played with friends in a video chat.

It has been called the "virtual living room" of apps by The New Yorker.

Usage during COVID-19 pandemic
As many countries went into lockdown during the beginning of the COVID-19 pandemic in early 2020, the app experienced a large increase in popularity. It was downloaded more than 17 million times in March 2020, winning a 2020 Webby Award for "Breakout of the Year". In late March 2020, media outlets reported that Houseparty had been hacked. The report was denied by CEO Sistani stating that "if anyone wanted to know whether we had been hacked, it would be us." According to Fast Company, the app ranked first in Social Networking on the iOS App Store with 50 million downloads through April 2020.

References

External links 
 

Videotelephony
Android (operating system) software
Defunct social networking services
Epic Games
IOS software
2016 software
Internet properties established in 2016
Internet properties disestablished in 2021